Westar was a fleet of geosynchronous communications satellites operating in the C band which were launched by Western Union from 1974 to 1984.  There were seven Westar satellites in all, with five of them launched and operating under the Westar name.

Background
Westar 1 (launched on April 13, 1974) has the distinction of being the USA's first commercially launched geosynchronous communications satellite, following North America's first geosynchronous communications satellite, Canada's Anik A1 in 1972.  Westar 1 was put into orbit at 99° W in the Clarke belt (99° W now being the home of Galaxy 16).

Westar 2 was launched shortly afterward on October 10, 1974. Westar 3, the first satellite to use TDMA switched data, was launched on August 10, 1979.  Westars 1, 2 and 3 were built by Hughes using the HS 333 platform of spin-scan stabilized satellites. They only had 12 transponders on board, as opposed to later C-band communications satellites having 24, and even contemporary satellites of the same era, such as RCA's Satcom 1.

The later Westar 4 (launched on February 26, 1982) and Westar 5 (launched on June 9, 1982) satellites, were based on the Hughes HS 376 platform, and had 24 transponders available, as opposed to the 12 on Westars 1, 2, and 3.

Westar 6, also an HS-376 based satellite, was launched from STS-41-B on February 3, 1984, to be put into service afterward, but the perigee kick motor (also known as the Payload Assist Module, or PAM) on the satellite failed during its approach to geosynchronous orbit, placing it at an improper and inoperable low Earth orbit.  It was retrieved on November 16, 1984, by the STS-51-A mission of NASA's Space Shuttle, where it was brought back to earth.  It was then resold to AsiaSat in Hong Kong, who refurbished it and relaunched it on April 7, 1990 as AsiaSat 1 aboard a Long March 3 rocket.  The Space Shuttle mission to retrieve Westar 6, as well as the Palapa B2 satellite which shared the launch payload with Westar 6, was partially funded by the insurance companies led by Lloyd's of London who insured the launch of those two satellites.

An on-ground spare satellite to Westar 6, Westar 6S, was in development by Western Union and Hughes when Western Union decided to divest themselves of their telecommunications-based assets starting in the early 1980s after suffering heavy financial losses.  This resulted in Western Union selling the Westar satellite fleet and operations to Hughes in 1988.

Hughes then finished development of Westar 6S, and renamed it Galaxy 6.  Modifications were made to it, and Galaxy 6 was launched on October 12, 1990.

Hughes later launched the Galaxy 4 satellite in 1992 and Galaxy 5 in 1993 to replace Westar 4 and 5 respectively, after the latter satellites reached the end of their useful life.

Uplink sites for Westar
During the life of the Westar fleet, Western Union operated these dedicated uplink sites (now defunct, unless noted) for Westar:
 The Yacolt earth station at Yacolt, Washington  (45.8633,-122.3956). (now a satellite uplink site for Verizon Communications)
 The Sky Valley earth station, located near Cordelia, California  (north of San Francisco)
 The Steele Valley earth station, near Perris, California  (southeast of Los Angeles)
 The Kipapa earth station, near Waipio Acres, Hawaii 
 The Cedar Hill earth station, at Cedar Hill, Texas (near Dallas) (now a satellite teleport station once again, as the headquarters of Westar Satellite Services )
 The Estill Fork earth station, at Estill Fork, Alabama 
 The Lake Geneva earth station, at Lake Geneva, Wisconsin  (northwest of Chicago)
 and the Glenwood earth station at Glenwood, New Jersey .  Glenwood was the head earth station for the Westar fleet, providing TT&C (telemetry, tracking & control) & uplink services. (Now the uplink site for Sirius XM)

References

External links
 Description of the Westar satellites at Boeing Satellite System's (formerly Hughes) web site
 Gunter's Space Page - information on Westars 1, 2 & 3
 Gunter's Space Page information on 4, 5, & 6
 Photos of the Westar Sky Valley earth station
 Map of terrestrial microwave relay sites of Western Union, including satellite uplink sites for Westar at the time

Communications satellites
1974 in science
1984 disestablishments
Western Union